Muriel Engelman ( January 12, 1921 – June 30, 2022) was an American military veteran, writer, and public speaker who was widely recognised for her service as a United States Army nurse during World War II.

Wartime service

Enlistment 
Phillips was in her final year of nurse training at Cambridge Hospital in Cambridge, Massachusetts, when Pearl Harbor was bombed. Immediately after finishing her training, Phillips enlisted in the armed services as an army nurse. Her army training at Fort Devens, Massachusetts, was even more rigorous than nursing training: she endured hours of drills, 15-mile hikes, classroom study of diseases, and crawling under live ammunition.

Deployment 
Phillips was deployed for Great Britain, and served in Wales for six months. After this, her assignment was moved to the English Channel to care for those wounded after the invasion of Normandy. The mission of Phillips's unit was to set up a tent hospital outside of Liége, Belgium to treat Allied soldiers. Work in a field tent was difficult at best. The nurses worked without running water or electricity, and the dirt floors of the tents often turned to mud.

After a month at Liége, the Germans began a bombing campaign to destroy railroad tracks nearby. Bombs came roughly every fifteen minutes for two straight months, sometimes falling on parts of the tent hospital. Despite the horrors of work on the battlefield, Phillips got much satisfaction from treating the GIs.

The Battle of the Bulge 
In December 1944, with the Battle of the Bulge, the hospital became even more crowded and busy. Phillips's hospital was one of the closest to the fighting lines. The oncoming German forces were particularly threatening for Phillips, as she was Jewish. On Christmas Eve, the Germans were only ten miles from Liége, and the hospital began the evacuation procedure. The hospital where Phillips worked was specifically targeted, and many servicemen and women died due to German antipersonnel bombs. Phillips survived the Battle of the Bulge, and the war ended months later.

After the war 
Phillips and the entire hospital unit were awarded a European Theater ribbon and medal for their service, as well as three battle stars. Phillips was finally discharged in January 1946 as a first lieutenant. 

In 1946, she married Melvin Engelman; they lived in Wappingers Falls, New York. In 2010, they retired to Florida.

In 2008, Phillips published her memoirs, Mission Accomplished: Stop the Clock which included eleven chapters dedicated to her wartime experiences.

Phillips was awarded the Legion of Honour, France's highest honor. Her husband, Melvin Engelman, predeceased her in 2020, aged 99. Phillips died in Laguna Woods, California, in June 2022, at the age of 101. Her death was announced nearly a month later.

Works 
 Mission Accomplished: Stop the Clock, iUniverse, 2008. .

References

External links
  
 Muriel Engelman, hero and front-line nurse in WWII, dies at 101".  TODAY.com. July 24, 2022 
 “A Nurse at the Battle of the Bulge” WWII Veteran Muriel Engelman American Warrior Radio, December 28, 2014 

1921 births
2022 deaths
People from Meriden, Connecticut
Military personnel from Connecticut
Writers from Connecticut
21st-century American women
Female United States Army nurses in World War II
Recipients of the Legion of Honour
American centenarians
Women centenarians